Kurbatovo is a rural locality (a settlement) and the administrative center of Kurbatovskoye Rural Settlement, Nizhnedevitsky District, Voronezh Oblast, Russia. The population was 2,207 as of 2010. There are 17 streets.

Geography 
Kurbatovo is located 31 km northeast of Nizhnedevitsk (the district's administrative centre) by road. Verkhneye Turovo is the nearest rural locality.

References 

Rural localities in Nizhnedevitsky District